War Photographer is a 2001 documentary by Christian Frei.

War Photographer may also refer to:

War photography, the profession
War Photographer, a music video by Jason Forrest

de:War Photographer